The Hong Kong Classic Cup is a Thoroughbred set weights horse race in Hong Kong for four year olds, run over a distance of 1800 metres. The first three finishers in this race have priority to run in the Hong Kong Derby, which is the most prestigious race on the domestic racing calendar. The race was known as the Hong Kong Derby Trial until 2010.

Winners since 2006

 The 2010 winner King Dancer was later exported to Europe and renamed Uramazin.

See also
 List of Hong Kong horse races

References
Racing Post:
 The Hong Kong Jockey Club official website of Mercedes-Benz Hong Kong Classic Cup(2011/12)
 Racing Information of Mercedes-Benz Hong Kong Classic Cup (2011/12)
 The Hong Kong Jockey Club 

Horse races in Hong Kong